The 2007 NORCECA Beach Volleyball Circuit at Trinidad and Tobago was held May 25–27, 2007 in Chaguanas, Trinidad and Tobago. It was the fourth leg of the NORCECA Beach Volleyball Circuit 2007.

Women's competition

References
 NORCECA
 BV Database (Archived 2009-05-16)
 PR Volleyball Fed

Trinidad and Tobago
Norceca Beach Volleyball Circuit (Trinidad And Tobago), 2007